The women's freestyle 55 kilograms wrestling competition at the 2002 Asian Games in Busan was held on 6 October and 7 October at the Yangsan Gymnasium.

Schedule
All times are Korea Standard Time (UTC+09:00)

Results 
Legend
WO — Won by walkover

Final standing

References
2002 Asian Games Official Report, Page 781
FILA Database

Wrestling at the 2002 Asian Games